The 1951 Prince Edward Island general election was held in the Canadian province of Prince Edward Island on April 26, 1951.

The governing Liberals of Premier J. Walter Jones held on to their majority in the Legislature over the opposition Progressive Conservatives led by Reginald Bell, who was elected leader of the party in 1950. Both parties kept the same number of seats they earned in the previous election, though eight seats did change hands.

The democratic socialist Co-operative Commonwealth Federation fell back from their previous high in 1947, losing over half of their vote. This would be the last election contested by the CCF or any third party in provincial PEI elections until the CCF's successor, the New Democratic Party, ran in by-elections in 1972.

This election featured the first female candidate for office, Hilda Ramsay, who came in third while running for the CCF as Councillor in 3rd Prince.

Party Standings

Members Elected

The Legislature of Prince Edward Island had two levels of membership from 1893 to 1996 - Assemblymen and Councillors. This was a holdover from when the Island had a bicameral legislature, the General Assembly and the Legislative Council.

In 1893, the Legislative Council was abolished and had its membership merged with the Assembly, though the two titles remained separate and were elected by different electoral franchises. Assembleymen were elected by all eligible voters of within a district, while Councillors were only elected by landowners within a district.

Kings

Queens

Prince

Sources

1951 elections in Canada
Elections in Prince Edward Island
1951 in Prince Edward Island
April 1951 events in Canada